is one of 9 wards of Kobe, Japan. It has an area of 137.86 km², and a population of 248,407 (2008). Nishi in Japanese means west.  Nishi-ku occupies the northwestern part of the city.

External links

 Official website of Nishi-ku, Kobe

Wards of Kobe